Laer is a municipality in the district of Steinfurt, in North Rhine-Westphalia, Germany.

Since the ae spelling already contradicted the rules in force before 1996, it was not amended in accordance with a recommendation of the Standing Committee on Geographical Names.

Gallery

References

Steinfurt (district)